

Public sector (life)

Bangladesh Jiban Bima Corporation

Public sector (non-life)

Bangladesh Sadharan Bima Corporation

Private sector (life)

1. Sonali Life Insurance Company Limited 

3.Baira Life Insurance Company Limited.

4. Chartered  Life Insurance Company Limited

5. Alpha islami Life Insurance Company Limited.

6. Astha Life Insurance company Limited (a concern of Bangladesh Army welfare Trust).

7. Meghna Life Insurance Company Ltd.

8. National Life Insurance Company Ltd.

9. Padma Islami Life Insurance Company Ltd.

10. Popular Life Insurance Company Ltd.

11. Bengal Islami Life Insurance Ltd.

12. Prime Islami Life Insurance Co. Ltd.

13. Progressive Life Insurance Company Ltd.

14. Rupali Life Insurance Company Ltd.

15. Sandhani Life Insurance Company Ltd.

16. Sunflower Life Insurance Company Ltd.

17. Sunlife Insurance Company Ltd.

18. Zenith Islami Life Insurance Ltd.

19. Mercantile Islami Life Insurance Ltd.

20. Pragati Life Insurance Ltd.

21. Guardian Life Insurance Ltd.

22. Fareast islami Life Insurance Company Ltd 

23. Best Life Insurance Company Ltd.

24. Protective Islami Life Insurance Co. Ltd.

25. Bondhon Life Insurance Co. Ltd.

26. Sawdesh Life Insurance Co. Ltd.

27. Diamond Life Insurance Co. Ltd.

28. Delta Life Insurance Ltd.

29. Trust Islami Life Insurance Co. Ltd.

30. Jamuna Life Insurance Ltd.

31. Golden Life Insurance Ltd.

32. Homeland Life Insurance Company Ltd.

33. Life Insurance Corporation (LIC) of Bangladesh Ltd.

34. NRB Islami Life Insurance Company Ltd.

35. Gurdian life insurence limited

Private sector (non-Life)
1. Agrani Insurance Company Ltd.

2. Asia Insurance Ltd.

3. Asia Pacific Gen Insurance Co. Ltd.

4. Bangladesh Co-operatives Ins. Ltd.

5. Bangladesh General Insurance Co. Ltd.

6. Bangladesh National Insurance Co.Ltd.

7. Central Insurance Company Ltd.

8. City General Insurance Company Ltd.

9. Continental Insurance Ltd.

10. Crystal Insurance Company Ltd.

11. Desh Gen. Insurance Company Ltd.

12. Eastern Insurance Company Ltd.

13. Eastland Insurance Company Ltd.

14. Express Insurance Ltd.

15. Federal Insurance Company Ltd.

16. Global Insurance Ltd.

17. Green Delta Insurance Co. Ltd.

18. Islami Commercial Insurance Co. Ltd.

19. Islami Insurance Bangladesh Ltd.

20. Janata Insurance Company Ltd.

21. Karnaphuli Insurance Company Ltd.

22. Meghna Insurance Company Ltd.

23. Mercantile Insurance Company Ltd.

24. Nitol Insurance Company Ltd.

25. Northern Gen.Insurance Company Ltd.

26. Peoples Insurance Company Ltd.

27. Phonix Insurance Company Ltd.

28. Pioneer Insurance Company Ltd.

29. Pragati Insurance Ltd.

30. Paramount Insurance Company Ltd.

31. Prime Insurance Company Ltd.

32. Provati Insurance Company Ltd.

33. Purabi Gen Insurance Company Ltd.

34. Reliance Insurance Limited.

35. Republic Insurance Company Ltd.

36. Rupali Insurance Company Ltd.

37. Sonar Bangla Insurance Company Ltd.

38. South Asia Insurance Company Ltd.

39. Standard Insurance Ltd.

40. Takaful Islami Insurance Ltd.

41. Dhaka Insurance Ltd.

42. Union Insurance Company Ltd.

43. United Insurance Company Ltd.

44. Sena Kalyan Insurance Company Ltd.

45. Sikder Insurance Company Ltd.

External links
Insurance Development & Regulatory Authority of Bangladesh
Bangladesh Insurance Market Report 2017 
Online insurance in Bangladesh
Bangladesh Insurance Academy

Insurance companies of Bangladesh
Insurance
Bangladesh